Decatur Township may refer to the following places in the United States:

 Decatur Township, Macon County, Illinois
 Decatur Township, Marion County, Indiana
 Decatur Township, Michigan
 Decatur Township, Burt County, Nebraska
 Decatur Township, Lawrence County, Ohio
 Decatur Township, Washington County, Ohio
 Decatur Township, Clearfield County, Pennsylvania
 Decatur Township, Mifflin County, Pennsylvania

Township name disambiguation pages